The 1st Bristol MC & LCC Formula 2 Race was a Formula Two motor race held on 3 August 1953 at Thruxton Circuit, Hampshire. The race was run over 20 laps of the circuit, and was won by British driver Tony Rolt in a Connaught Type A-Lea Francis; Rolt also set fastest lap. Horace Gould in a Cooper T23-Bristol was second and Jack Walton was third in a Cooper T25-Bristol.

Results

References

1953 Formula Two races
1953 in British motorsport
August 1953 sports events in the United Kingdom